Babes in the Wood is a 1964 Off-Broadway musical adaptation of A Midsummer Night's Dream. The show's book and lyrics are by Rick Besoyan. It opened on December 28, 1964, at the Orpheum Theatre and closed on February 7, 1965.

Production 
In addition to writing the show, Besoyan also directed the production, with musical direction by Natalie Charlson. Sandy Farber and Aaron Schroeder produced the show. Ralph Beaumont provided choreography, and set design and lighting were done by Paul Morrison. Howard Barker designed the show's costumes.

Songs

Act l 

 This State of Affairs (Oberon, Robin Goodfellow)
 Titania's Philosophy (Titania)
 A Lover Waits (Oberon)
 The Gossip Song (Helena)
 I'm Not for You (Demetrius)
 I'm Not for You (Reprise) (Helena, Demetrius)
 Mother (Bottom)
 Old Fashioned Girl (Bottom, Goodfellow)
 Love Is Lovely (Lysander, Hermia)
 Babes in the Wood (Goodfellow)
 Love Is Lovely (Reprise) (Lysander, Helena)
 Finale (Company)

Act ll 

 Opening (Company)
 Anyone Can Make a Mistake (Goodfellow)
 Cavorting (Titania, Bottom)
 There's a Girl (Oberon, Demetrius)
 There's a Girl (reprise) (Demetrius)
 I'm Not for You (reprise) (Lysander)
 Little Tear (Hermia)
 Babes in the Wood (reprise) (Goodfellow)
 Helena's Solution (Helena, Lysander, Demetrius)
 Helena (Demetrius, Lysander)
 Midsummer Night (Oberon, Titania)
 Moon Madness (Titania, Bottom)
 A Lover Waits (reprise) (Oberon)
 The Alphabet Song (Titania, Hermia, Helena)
 FInale (Company)

Cast

Reception 
The New York Times criticized the show, saying it "manages to rob his source of all enchantment", and although its music was enjoyable, the songs added nothing to the plot. The view of the musical as "pleasant but forgettable" seems to have been shared by other theater critics as well.

References 

1964 musicals
Off-Broadway musicals
Works based on A Midsummer Night's Dream